Alphonsus James Orger (21 January 1915 – 11 June 2002) was an Australian rules footballer who played with St Kilda in the Victorian Football League (VFL).

Notes

External links 

1915 births
2002 deaths
Australian rules footballers from Melbourne
St Kilda Football Club players
People from South Yarra, Victoria